The Men's 200 metre breaststroke event at the 2010 Commonwealth Games took place on 9 October 2010, at the SPM Swimming Pool Complex.

Three heats were held. The heat in which a swimmer competed did not formally matter for advancement, as the swimmers with the top eight times from the entire field qualified for the finals.

Heats

Heat 1

Heat 2

Heat 3

Final

References

Aquatics at the 2010 Commonwealth Games